William Edmond Lescaze  (March 27, 1896 – February 9, 1969), was a Swiss-born American architect, city planner and industrial designer. He is ranked among the pioneers of modernism in American architecture.

Biography 

William Lescaze was born in Onex, Switzerland. He studied at the Collège Calvin and at the École des Beaux-Arts, before completing his formal education at the École polytechnique fédérale de Zurich in Zurich where Karl Moser was a teacher, receiving his degree in 1919.

He contributed to the post-war reconstruction effort of Arras, and then immigrated to the United States in 1920. He worked for some time at the architectural firm of Hubbell & Benes in Cleveland, Ohio, and taught French at the local YMCA's night classes.

In 1923, he was offered a modeling job and moved to New York City where he set up his business. His first major work was the design of the Oak Lane Country Day School outside Philadelphia. After a brief time in New York, he returned to Cleveland.

In 1927, he designed the Sutton House Apartments project in New York City. Income from the project allowed him to move back to New York City.

In 1929, Philadelphia architect George Howe invited William Lescaze to form a partnership, Howe & Lescaze. Within just a few weeks after joining forces, the duo began work on a large project for downtown Philadelphia. The resulting structure, completed in 1932, was the Philadelphia Savings Fund Society (PSFS) Building, which is today generally considered the first International Modernist skyscraper, and the first International Style building of wide significance in the United States. It was also the first building with full air conditioning. Lescaze is generally given credit for the design: letters from Howe to Lescaze quote the former insisting to the latter that "the design is definitely yours." The structure replaced the bank's former headquarters in Philadelphia, a classicist structure near Washington Square built in 1897.

In 1930, Howe & Lescaze submitted a design for the new building of the Museum of Modern Art in New York.  The wood and metal model was donated to the MOMA in 1994. In 1935, William Lescaze established his own architecture firm, Lescaze & Associates.

His 1937 Alfred Loomis house in Tuxedo Park, NY is regarded as an early experiment in double-skin facade construction. In 1939 he designed a futuristic "House for 2089" that included a helipad on the roof.

Lescaze was also the design lead for the 1937 Williamsburg Houses in Brooklyn, a pioneering 20-building modernist housing project modeled on European examples.  He later taught industrial design at the Pratt Institute (1943–1945). Among his built works were the CBS West Coast studios Columbia Square on Sunset Boulevard (1938).

William Lescaze also designed the office building at 711 Third Street, the city and municipal courts building in the Civic Center in Manhattan, and the High School of Art and Design. From 1949 to 1959, he served at the State Building Code Commission

William Lescaze died on February 9, 1969, of a heart attack at his New York home. He was a proponent of modern architecture, stating it was the only architecture that could solve the housing problem.

Major buildings and projects 

 1929: Oak Lane Country Day School, Blue Bell, Pennsylvania, United States
 1930: Sun Terrace (Field House), New Hartford, Connecticut, United States
 1932: High Cross House, Dartington Hall, Devon, United Kingdom
 1932: PSFS Building, (today: Loews Philadelphia Hotel) Philadelphia, Pennsylvania, United States
 1934: Roy Spreter Studio, Philadelphia, Pennsylvania, United States
 1934: William Lescaze House and Office, 211 East 48th Street, Manhattan, New York, United States. The house was the first to use glass blocks in New York. It was designated as a New York City landmark in 1976, and added to the National Register of Historic Places in 1980. In April 2018, the house was put on sale for $4.95 million after renovation to match its original condition.
 1935: Raymond C. and Mildred Kramer House at 32 East 74th Street in Manhattan, New York. The house was put on sale in 2008, and finally found a buyer in 2015 for $15.9 million. In December 2017, after renovation, the house is back on sale with a $20 million price tag.
 1936: Magnolia Lounge, Dallas, Texas, United States
 1937: Alfred Loomis house, Tuxedo Park, New York, United States
 1938: CBS Columbia Square Studios, Los Angeles, California, United States
 1938: Williamsburg Houses, Brooklyn, New York, United States
 1941: Norman residence, 70th Street between Park Avenue and Lexington Avenue, Manhattan, New York, United States
 1960: Manhattan Civil Court, Civic Center, Manhattan, New York, United States
 1961: Manhattanville Houses, New York, United States
 1962: Church Center for the United Nations, United Nations Plaza and 44th Street, Manhattan, New York, United States
 1963: Brotherhood in Action Building (today: David M. Schwartz Fashion Education Center, Parsons The New School for Design), Manhattan, New York, United States

Honors 
 1951: Named a Fellow of the American Institute of Architects (AIA)
 In Geneva, a street, the chemin William-Lescaze, was named after him.

Personal life 
He was married to Mary Hughes. His son Lee Adrien Lescaze (1938–1996) was an editor for The Washington Post.

References

External links

 Lescaze, William (1896–1969) – Philadelphia Architects and Buildings biography
 Critical Cities on Lescaze's New York apartment and studio on E48th street
 William Lescaze archival card catalog. Held by the Department of Drawings & Archives, Avery Architectural & Fine Arts Library, Columbia University.

1896 births
1969 deaths
People from the canton of Geneva
École des Beaux-Arts alumni
Swiss emigrants to the United States
20th-century American architects
Swiss architects
Modernist architects
Fellows of the American Institute of Architects